Talisi is an alternate spelling of Tallassee, which may refer to:

 Tallassee, Alabama, previously called Talisi, a city in Alabama, U.S.
 Tallassee (Cherokee town), an ancient Overhill Cherokee village site in Tennessee, U.S.